Louis R. Vitullo (July 2, 1924 – January 3, 2006) was a Chicago police sergeant and chief microanalyst at the city's crime lab. 

Vitullo helped to develop the rape kit, which standardized evidence collection in cases of sexual assault. Marty Goddard, a victim advocate, had seen the need for more systematic evidence at trial, and brought her concerns and the idea for a kit to Vitullo.  Vitullo helped develop Goddard's prototype.  Although the resulting evidence kits were for a time called Vitullo kits, this name has more recently come under criticism as part of a general push to honor Goddard's contribution to the kits.

Death
Vitullo died at Advocate Good Shepherd Hospital in Barrington on January 3, 2006, after he collapsed at his home in Cary.

References

Further reading
  (A book by Vitullo's granddaughter.)

1924 births
2006 deaths
American forensic scientists
Chicago Police Department officers
People from Cary, Illinois
20th-century American inventors